Bob Lloyd (born 24 October 1940) is an Australian cricketer. He played in sixteen first-class matches for South Australia between 1960 and 1967.

See also
 List of South Australian representative cricketers

References

External links
 

1940 births
Living people
Australian cricketers
South Australia cricketers
Cricketers from Adelaide